Fabrizio De Poli (born 10 January 1958) is an Italian football administrator and former player.

Playing career
De Poli played in Serie B with S.P.A.L. in the 1979–80 season.

Administrator career
De Poli worked as administrator for the Cittadella, Genoa, Lucchese and Vicenza. From 2014 to 2016, he worked for Padova. From 12 November 2016 to 1 June 2017 he worked as general manager for Taranto.

External links
 Profile at Calciatori.com 
 Profile at Uslivorno.it 
 Profile at Padovasport.tv 

1958 births
Living people
Italian footballers
Association football midfielders
Serie B players
Treviso F.B.C. 1993 players
S.P.A.L. players
Calcio Padova players
U.S. Livorno 1915 players
Lucchese 1905 players
S.S. Arezzo players